Vicente Pérez Valdivieso (ca. 1810 – ca. 1890) was Mayor of Ponce, Puerto Rico, from 11 May 1870 to 27 July 1871.

Mayoral term
Starting off as mayor on 11 May 1870, Pérez Valdivieso was the first mayor of Ponce after the institution of political parties for the first time in Puerto Rico in 1870. He is best remembered for his 10 July 1870 "Reglamento para la Guardia Municipal de la Villa de Ponce."

See also

 List of Puerto Ricans
 List of mayors of Ponce, Puerto Rico

References

Further reading
 Ramon Marin. Las Fiestas Populares de Ponce. Editorial Universidad de Puerto Rico. 1994.

External links
 Guardia Civil española (c. 1898) (Includes military ranks in 1880s Spanish Empire.)

Mayors of Ponce, Puerto Rico
1810s births
1890s deaths
Year of death uncertain
Year of birth uncertain